The Versoix is a river in France and in Switzerland. It is a  tributary of Lake Geneva.

The river begins in the Jura Mountains in Ain, France as Rivière la Divonne. It flows eastward through Divonne-les-Bains and Lac de Divonne approaching the Canton of Vaud. From there it turns southward toward form  of the France–Switzerland border, entering the Canton of Geneva and continuing eastward toward Versoix where it enters the lake.

References

Rivers of France
Rivers of Switzerland
International rivers of Europe
France–Switzerland border
Rivers of the canton of Geneva
Rivers of Auvergne-Rhône-Alpes
Rivers of Ain